Kaltandar or Kaltondar may refer to:
 Kaltandar-e Olya
 Kaltandar-e Sofla